Dorking West railway station is in Dorking, Surrey, England.

Dorking West is on the North Downs Line. The station is managed by Great Western Railway, which also operates all trains serving it. The station is unstaffed, and there is no ticket office at the station, nor have ticket machines been installed. Passengers travelling from the station must purchase tickets on board the train.

History
The Reading, Guildford and Reigate Railway opened the station in 1849 as "Dorking". From the outset it was leased and worked by the South Eastern Railway, which absorbed the RG&RR in 1852. The staggered platforms are typical of stations built for the SER where no footbridge was provided. The arrangement of the platforms enabled passengers to cross behind trains if two were at the station simultaneously.

In the 1923 Grouping the SER and LB&SCR became part of the new Southern Railway, which immediately renamed both stations. The SR renamed the former LB&SCR station "Dorking North" and the original RG&RR station "Dorking Town". In 1987 Network SouthEast changed "Dorking Town" to "Dorking West".

British Railways closed the goods yard in 1963 and made the station unstaffed in 1967.

The SER originally ran trains from here to  via . Latterly the service ran on to Tonbridge in Kent.

Although it is the least used of the three Dorking stations, the official Annual rail passenger usage data (as low as 16 passengers / year in 2011–12) is misleading because most tickets are issued to/from 'Dorking Stations' rather than specifically Dorking West.

Location
Access is from Station Road (to the south) through the industrial estate car parks, down an unlit unsignposted footpath. The station has no car park but is accessible for wheelchairs from both sides.

Services

Images

References

Railway stations in Surrey
Dorking
Former South Eastern Railway (UK) stations
Railway stations in Great Britain opened in 1849
Railway stations served by Great Western Railway
1849 establishments in England